"You're the One" is a single from The Black Keys, from their album Magic Potion. It was released February 26, 2007 as a digital download by V2 Records.

Reception
Mike Diver, in a review for Drowned in Sound, rated You're the One 7 out of 10, calling it "truly laid-back fare, ideal fodder for just kicking back of a muggy Sunday afternoon and popping the top off a cool beer". Ben Davis of contactmusic.com called the song "pure Lennon", sounding like "I'm So Tired's even more world-weary cousin". You're the One appears on the fifth spot of a list of the Black Keys' best songs by diffuser.fm.

Track listing
 "You're the One"
 "The Way I Feel When I'm With You" (outtake)
 "Work Me" (Live at The Avalon in Boston, November 16, 2005.)

Personnel
Patrick Carney - drums, producer
Dan Auerbach - guitars, vocals

References

The Black Keys songs
2007 songs
Songs written by Dan Auerbach
Songs written by Patrick Carney
2007 singles
V2 Records singles